Elizabeth McComb (born December 1, 1952) is an American gospel and blues singer, songwriter and pianist.

Biography

The sixth of seven children, Elizabeth McComb grew up in Cleveland in an African-American family that originally came from Mississippi. Her father, a factory worker, died when she was very young. Her mother was a preacher and the pastor of a Pentecostal church. Three of her sisters formed a vocal group called The Daughters of Zion that performed in local churches. Years later, they would sometimes accompany McComb during her concerts. McComb started singing at the early age of three. 

McComb began with violin but decided to switch to the piano. While still young, she joined the Karamu House Theater school and then the cultural center's theater company. 

McComb went to New York and started auditioning for shows and musicals. With the support of her cousin, Annie Moss, she toured in Europe as part of the itinerant "Roots of Rock'n’Roll" show. She regularly performed in Europe, traveling back to the United States several times a year.

Discography
 Acoustic Woman, 1992, (Back to Blues/GVE) distribution EMI
 Rock my Soul, 1993, (Back to Blues/GVE) distribution EMI
 Live, 1994, (Back to Blues/GVE/licence Sony) distribution EMI
 Trilogy Coffret 3 CDs, (Back to Blues/GVE) épuisé
 Time is Now, 1996, (Back to Blues/GVE) distribution EMI
 Live à l'Olympia, 1998, (Back to Blues/GVE) distribution EMI
 Le Meilleur de Liz McComb, 1998, (Back to Blues/GVE/licence TF1 musique)
 The Spirit of New Orleans, 2001, (Back to Blues/GVE) distribution EMI
 L'Essentiel/FIRE, 2001, (Back to Blues/GVE) distribution EMI
 Soul, Peace & Love, 2007, (Back to Blues/GVE) distribution EMI
 The Sacred Concert, 19 Mai 2009, (GVE) distribution Naïve

Videography
 Saint-Augustin – (solo & duo) Paris
 Olympia – Paris – DVD distribution EMI
 Vienne Jazz Festival – 1999 and 2002
 Parc Floral Jazz Festival – Paris
 Eglise de La Madeleine – Paris 1995 and 1996
 Basilique Sainte-Clotilde – Paris
 Eglise des Invalides – Paris
 Eglise Saint-Sulpice 2002 – Paris
 Opéra de Lyon 1994
 Athènes (Acropole)
 Festival de Fes avec l'ARC gospel choir
 Vittoria Jazz festival
 Quai du Blues/Nouvel Obs Event – Paris
 Bethléem 24-12-99
 Music Mania with 3 pianos ensemble
 Palais des Sports de Paris, HD (feb 2007)
 Festival de Coutances, HD (May 2007)

References

External links
 

American gospel singers
Living people
1952 births
Musicians from Cleveland